Choreutis sandaracina is a moth in the family Choreutidae. It was described by Edward Meyrick in 1907. It is found in India. and Australia.

References

Choreutis
Moths described in 1907